Charles Jessup (April 18, 1883 – death date unknown) was an American Negro league pitcher in the 1900s.

A native of Kentucky, Jessup made his Negro leagues debut in 1907 with the Leland Giants. He went on to play for the Minneapolis Keystones in 1908 and 1909.

References

External links
 and Seamheads

1883 births
Year of death missing
Place of birth missing
Place of death missing
Leland Giants players
Minneapolis Keystones players
Baseball pitchers
Baseball players from Kentucky